

Day 1 (August 25)
 Seeds out:
 Men's Singles:  Mikhail Youzhny [21],  Julien Benneteau [24]
 Women's Singles:  Garbiñe Muguruza [25]
 Schedule of Play – Day 1

Day 2 (August 26)
 Seeds out:
 Men's Singles:  Lukáš Rosol [29]
 Women's Singles:  Dominika Cibulková [12],  Svetlana Kuznetsova [20],  Zhang Shuai [32]
 Men's Doubles:  Rohan Bopanna /  Aisam-ul-Haq Qureshi [13],  Treat Huey /  Dominic Inglot [14]
 Schedule of Play – Day 2

Day 3 (August 27)
 Seeds out:
 Men's Singles:  Santiago Giraldo [27],  Jérémy Chardy [30]
 Women's Singles:  Agnieszka Radwańska [4],  Sloane Stephens [21],  Kurumi Nara [31]
 Men's Doubles:  Julien Benneteau /  Édouard Roger-Vasselin [5]
 Women's Doubles:  Raquel Kops-Jones /  Abigail Spears [6],  Ashleigh Barty /  Casey Dellacqua [10],  Julia Görges /  Anna-Lena Grönefeld [16]
 Mixed Doubles:  Kristina Mladenovic /  Daniel Nestor [4]
Schedule of Play – Day 3

Day 4 (August 28)
 Seeds out:
 Men's Singles:  Guillermo García-López [28],  Fernando Verdasco [31]
 Women's Singles:  Ana Ivanovic [8],  Anastasia Pavlyuchenkova [23],  Samantha Stosur [24],  Madison Keys [27]
 Men's Doubles:  Jamie Murray /  John Peers [15]
 Women's Doubles:  Tímea Babos /  Kristina Mladenovic [7]
 Mixed Doubles:  Julia Görges /  Nenad Zimonjić [7]
Schedule of Play – Day 4

Day 5 (August 29)
 Seeds out:
 Men's Singles:  Ernests Gulbis [11],  Fabio Fognini [15],  Ivo Karlović [25],  João Sousa [32]
 Women's Singles:  Simona Halep [2],  Angelique Kerber [6],  Andrea Petkovic [18],  Venus Williams [19],  Alizé Cornet [22],  Sabine Lisicki [26],  Roberta Vinci [28]
 Men's Doubles:  Juan Sebastián Cabal /  Robert Farah [16]
 Women's Doubles:  Chan Hao-ching /  Chan Yung-jan [14]
 Mixed Doubles:  Lucie Hradecká /  Horia Tecău [5],  Raquel Kops-Jones /  Juan Sebastián Cabal [8]
Schedule of Play – Day 5

Day 6 (August 30)
 Seeds out:
 Men's Singles:  John Isner [13],  Leonardo Mayer [23]
 Women's Singles:  Petra Kvitová [3],  Carla Suárez Navarro [15],  Barbora Záhlavová-Strýcová [30]
 Women's Doubles:  Sara Errani /  Roberta Vinci [1],  Anabel Medina Garrigues /  Yaroslava Shvedova [13],  Anastasia Pavlyuchenkova /  Lucie Šafářová [15]
Schedule of Play – Day 6

Day 7 (August 31)
 Seeds out:
 Men's Singles:  David Ferrer [4],  Richard Gasquet [12],  Kevin Anderson [18],  Feliciano López [19]
 Women's Singles:  Maria Sharapova [5],  Jelena Janković [9],  Lucie Šafářová [14]
 Men's Doubles:  Daniel Nestor /  Nenad Zimonjić [3],  Michaël Llodra /  Nicolas Mahut [10]
 Women's Doubles:  Lucie Hradecká /  Michaëlla Krajicek [11],  Garbiñe Muguruza /  Carla Suárez Navarro [12]
 Mixed Doubles:  Andrea Hlaváčková /  Alexander Peya [2]
Schedule of Play – Day 7

Day 8 (September 1)
 Seeds out:
 Men's Singles:  Milos Raonic [5],  Jo-Wilfried Tsonga [9],  Tommy Robredo [16],  Philipp Kohlschreiber [22]
 Women's Singles:   Eugenie Bouchard [7],  Casey Dellacqua [29]
 Men's Doubles:  Leander Paes /  Radek Štěpánek [6],  Vasek Pospisil /  Jack Sock [8],  Jean-Julien Rojer /  Horia Tecău [9]
 Women's Doubles:  Hsieh Su-wei /  Peng Shuai [2],  Alla Kudryavtseva /  Anastasia Rodionova [9]
 Mixed Doubles:  Cara Black /  Leander Paes [3],  Katarina Srebotnik /  Rohan Bopanna [6]
Schedule of Play – Day 8

Day 9 (September 2)
 Seeds out:
 Men's Singles:  Grigor Dimitrov [7],  Roberto Bautista Agut [17],  Gilles Simon [26]
 Women's Singles:  Sara Errani [13]
 Men's Doubles:  David Marrero /  Fernando Verdasco [7],  Eric Butorac /  Raven Klaasen [12]
 Women's Doubles:  Květa Peschke /  Katarina Srebotnik [5]
Schedule of Play – Day 9

Day 10 (September 3)
 Seeds out:
 Men's Singles:  Stan Wawrinka [3],  Andy Murray [8]
 Women's Singles:  Flavia Pennetta [11],  Victoria Azarenka [16]
 Men's Doubles:  Alexander Peya /  Bruno Soares [2]
 Women's Doubles:  Andrea Hlaváčková /  Zheng Jie [8]
Schedule of Play – Day 10

Day 11 (September 4)
 Seeds out:
 Men's Singles:  Tomáš Berdych [6],  Gaël Monfils [20]
 Men's Doubles:  Ivan Dodig /  Marcelo Melo [4]
 Women's Doubles:  Cara Black /  Sania Mirza [3]
Schedule of Play – Day 11

Day 12 (September 5)
 Seeds out:
 Women's Singles:  Ekaterina Makarova [17]
Schedule of Play – Day 12

Day 13 (September 6)
 Seeds out:
 Men's Singles:  Novak Djokovic [1],  Roger Federer [2]
Schedule of Play – Day 13

Day 14 (September 7)
 Seeds out:
 Women's Singles:  Caroline Wozniacki [10]
 Men's Doubles:  Marcel Granollers /  Marc López [11]
Schedule of Play – Day 14

Day 15 (September 8)
 Seeds out: 
 Men's Singles:  Kei Nishikori [10]
 Schedule of Play – Day 15

Day-by-day summaries
US Open (tennis) by year – Day-by-day summaries